= No Land =

International music group

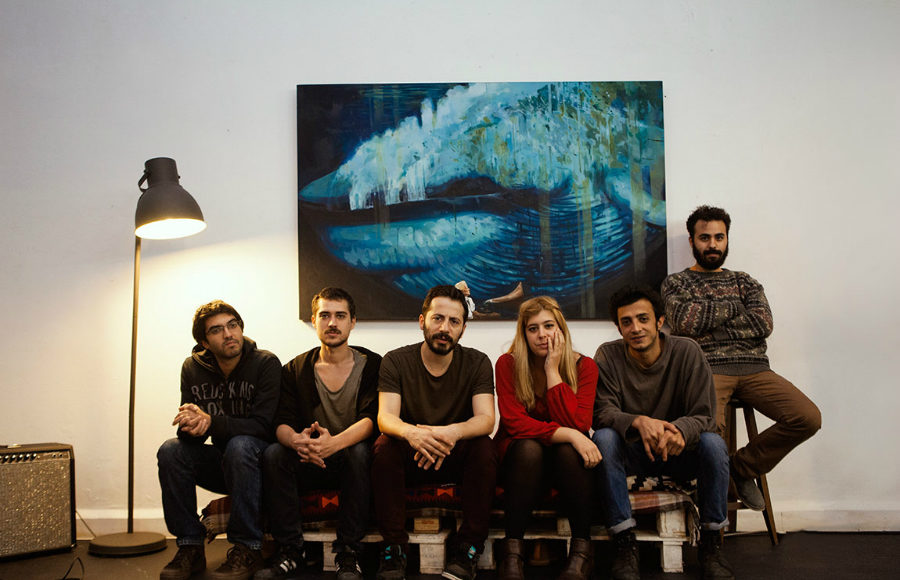

Background information
- Genres: Ethnic music, jazz
- Years active: 2013–present
- Members: Kamil Hajiyev (vocals, violin); Mehmet Akif Ersoy (acoustic guitar); Sahand Lesani ( electric guitar); Çağatay Vural (acoustic, bass guitar); Can Kalyoncu (drum); Hazal Akkerman (cello, vocals); Yağız Nevzat İpek (drums); Oğuzcan Bilgin (trumpet); Vugar Hasani (lyrics)
- Website: nolandmusic.com

No Land is a music group made up of Azerbaijani, Iranian and Turkish musicians and called No Land because they come from different cultures and places.

No Land music group was first established in 2012 by Sahand Lesani, Mehmet Akif Ersoy and Kamil Hajiyev. Later, Çağatay Vural, Can Kalyoncu, Hazal Akkerman, Yağız Nevzat İpek and Oğuzcan Bilgin joined the group. No Land released their first album "Aramızda" as of 2016. The album "Aramızda" includes some of the work done since 2013 and these works generally consisted of the songs that emerged during the first formation of the group. The second album "Pusulası Kaybolmuş" was released on digital platforms on 6 February 2019. There are eight songs in the album in Turkish, Azerbaijani, Persian and Russian. Almost all lyrics were written by Kamil Hajiyev and Vugar Hasani.

== Albums ==
=== Aramızda ===
- Pusulası kaybolmuş
- Yüzerdik
- Payız
- Niyə Belə Uzundur Bu Yollar
- Aramızda Dinozor
- Müstefilatun
- Değil
- Yolcu
- Sor
- Düşünme Kaybolursun
- 52 Hertz Whale – Outro

=== Pusulası Kaybolmuş ===
- Şehr-i yar
- Sodom Gomore
- Pusulası Kaybolmuş
- Lakrima
- Krilatiye Kacheli
- N'olmuş
- Pervin
- Seyir
